Sarchinu may refer to:
 Sarchinu Bala
 Sarchinu Pain